In probability theory, Luce's choice axiom, formulated by R. Duncan Luce (1959), states that the probability of selecting one item over another from a pool of many items is not affected by the presence or absence of other items in the pool. Selection of this kind is said to have "independence from irrelevant alternatives" (IIA).

Overview

Luce proposed two choice axioms. The second one is usually meant by "Luce's choice axiom", as the first one is usually called "independence from irrelevant alternatives" (IIA).

Luce's choice axiom 1 (IIA): if , then for any , we still have .

Luce's choice axiom 2 ("path independence"): for any .

Luce's choice axiom 1 is implied by choice axiom 2.

Matching law formulation 

Define the matching law selection rule , for some "value" function . This is sometimes called the softmax function, or the Boltzmann distribution.

Theorem: Any matching law selection rule satisfies Luce's choice axiom. Conversely, if  for all , then Luce's choice axiom implies that it is a matching law selection rule.

Applications
In economics, it can be used to model a consumer's tendency to choose one brand of product over another.

In behavioral psychology, it is used to model response behavior in the form of matching law.

In cognitive science, it is used to model approximately rational decision processes.

References

Decision theory